Sun Huan may refer to:

Sun Huan (Shuwu) (孫桓), style name Shuwu, Eastern Wu military general
Sun Huan (Jiming) (孫奐, 194–234), style name Jiming, fourth son of Sun Jing, Eastern Wu military general